The men's tournament of the 2014 European Curling Championships was held from November 22 to 29 at the Palladium de Champéry in Champéry, Switzerland. The winners of the Group C tournament in Zoetermeer, the Netherlands will move on to the Group B tournament. The top eight men's teams at the 2014 European Curling Championships will represent their respective nations at the 2015 Ford World Men's Curling Championship in Halifax, Nova Scotia, Canada.

Group A

Teams
The teams are listed as follows:

Round-robin standings
Final round-robin standings

Russia were eliminated from the tiebreaker by virtue of their head-to-head record against the other teams.

Round-robin results
All draw times are listed in Central European Time (UTC+1).

Draw 1
Saturday, November 22, 11:00

Draw 2
Saturday, November 22, 19:00

Draw 3
Sunday, November 23, 12:00

Draw 4
Sunday, November 23, 20:00

Draw 5
Monday, November 24, 14:00

Draw 6
Tuesday, November 25, 8:00

Draw 7
Tuesday, November 25, 16:00

Draw 8
Wednesday, November 26, 9:00

Draw 9
Wednesday, November 26, 19:00

Placement game
Thursday, November 27, 14:00

 qualifies for World Championships
 to play in World Challenge Games

World Challenge Games
The World Challenge Games are held between the eighth-ranked team in the Group A round robin and the winner of the Group B tournament to determine which of these two teams will play at the World Championships.

Challenge 1
Friday, November 28, 19:30

Challenge 2
Saturday, November 29, 9:00

Tiebreaker
Thursday, November 27, 14:00

Playoffs

1 vs. 2
Thursday, November 27, 19:00

3 vs. 4
Thursday, November 27, 19:00

Semifinal
Friday, November 28, 13:00

Bronze-medal game
Friday, November 28, 19:30

Gold-medal game
Saturday, November 29, 15:00

Player percentages
Round Robin only

Group B

Teams

Group A

Group B

Round-robin standings
Final round-robin standings

Team France did not attend the Group B tournament, and were given automatic forfeits for each of their games.

Round-robin results
All draw times are listed in Central European Time (UTC+1).

Draw 1
Saturday, November 22, 8:00

Draw 2
Saturday, November 22, 16:00

Draw 3
Sunday, November 23, 9:00

Draw 4
Sunday, November 23, 19:00

Draw 5
Monday, November 24, 8:00

Draw 6
Monday, November 24, 12:00

Draw 7
Monday, November 24, 20:00

Draw 8
Tuesday, November 25, 14:00

Draw 9
Tuesday, November 25, 19:00

Draw 10
Wednesday, November 26, 8:00

Draw 11
Wednesday, November 26, 12:00

Draw 12
Wednesday, November 26, 16:00

Tiebreaker
Thursday, November 27, 8:30

Playoffs

1 vs. 2
Thursday, November 27, 14:00

3 vs. 4
Thursday, November 27, 14:00

Semifinal
Thursday, November 27, 20:00

Bronze-medal game
Friday, November 28, 10:00

Gold-medal game
Friday, November 28, 10:00

Group C

Teams
Teams are to be announced.

Round-robin standings
Final round-robin standings

Round-robin results
All draw times are listed in Central European Time (UTC+1).

Draw 1
Sunday, October 5, 8:00

Draw 2
Sunday, October 5, 12:00

Draw 3
Sunday, October 5, 16:00

Draw 4
Sunday, October 5, 20:00

Draw 5
Monday, October 6, 8:00

Draw 6
Monday, October 6, 12:00

Draw 7
Monday, October 6, 16:00

Draw 8
Monday, October 6, 20:00

Draw 9
Tuesday, October 7, 8:00

Draw 10
Tuesday, October 7, 12:00

Draw 11
Tuesday, October 7, 16:00

Draw 12
Tuesday, October 7, 20:00

Draw 13
Wednesday, October 8, 8:00

Draw 14
Wednesday, October 8, 12:00

Draw 15
Wednesday, October 8, 16:00

Draw 17
Thursday, October 9, 8:00

Draw 18
Thursday, October 9, 12:00

Draw 19
Thursday, October 9, 16:00

Draw 20
Thursday, October 9, 20:00

Draw 21
Friday, October 10, 8:00

Draw 22
Friday, October 10, 12:00

Playoffs

1 vs. 2
Friday, October 10, 20:00

 advances to Group B competitions.
 advances to Second Place Game.

3 vs. 4
Saturday, October 11, 9:00

 advances to Second Place Game.

Second Place Game
Saturday, October 11, 13:30

 advances to Group B competitions.

References
General
Specific

External links

2014 in curling
European Curling Championships